Below are the programs that have been shown in Channel [V] International in Southeast Asia. Programs that are available exclusively at various Channel [V] affiliates are listed in their respective sections. Selected Channel [V] programs also air on STAR World exclusive for the Middle East viewers only and Channel [V] Philippines.

Currently aired programs

The Playlist – A playlist of seven music videos chosen by a viewer.
Top 5 – The 5 hottest clips of the moment from a specific genre, ranging from dance and rock to urban, pop, k-pop and indie.
[V] Loop – A program containing 2–3 themes and usually including 2–3 songs per the theme.
Double Shot – Two music videos played back-to-back that has a connection/link to each other.
XO – A playlist of alternative music by international artists.
[V] Morning Fix – Start your morning on the right side of the bed with all the hottest hits.
K-Pop Explosion – The trendiest and most popular K-pop clips of the moment.
Videoscope – The best music videos from a specific artist. Usually including 2 of his/her new releases at most.
[V]S – Ultimate showdown of the best in music as the bigwigs go up against one.
[V] The Rave – Dance and club music videos.
VCD (V Countdown and  [V] Countdown) – The 10 most popular videos in Asia this week.
[V] ATM (Asian Top Music) – The most popular videos in Asia of the moment.
Backtracks (Channel [V] Asia Hits Old and New music videos) – Features music hits from the 1950s, 1960s, 1970s, 1980s, 1990s, 2000s, and 2010s.
[V] Shot

Former programs

90210**
America's Next Top Model
AMP Around Asia +
Arcade
Artist Special
Australia's Next Top Model
Bacpackers
The Bad Girls Club
Battle of the Bands
Blaze and the Monster Machines
Britain's Next Top Model
Cactus Garden
Canada's Next Top Model
Cash Cab
Championship Gaming Series++
Club [V]
Custom Playlist
Daily Download
The Dave & Kerley Show
Double Day
The Dudesons
Fashion Files
Flava +
Fonejacker
Gene Simmons Family Jewels
Get Gorgeous
Hei-Beat
Hit Rater Countdown
Hits on [V]
Hot List
House of Noise
I Am Siam
iTunes 50 Countdown
The Janice Dickinson Modeling Agency
Keys to the VIP
Kung Faux
The List +
Make The Call
Melo-samosorn
MXC
MySpace Mixtape
New Stock
Night Shift
North Shore Boarding House
Parental Control
Pop! Goes the Weasel
Pop on [V]
Pop on [V] Countdown (renamed Top 5 Pop)
Popparazzi +++
Presenter Playlist
Rad Girls
The Record Shop +
Remote Control +
Rock on [V]
Rock on [V] Countdown (renamed Top 5 Rock)
The Rock Show +
Scene & Heard +
Singing with the Enemy
South Park
Soundtrack
Stylista  * 
The Ticket ++++
TNA Explosion++
TNA Wrestling++
Turn on [V]
Urban on [V]
Urban on [V] Countdown (renamed Top 5 Urban)
[V] Air Chart
[V] Boutique
[V] For Me
[V] Independent Countdown
[V] Live
[V] News
[V] Play Zone
[V] Plug
[V] Siam Top 40
[V] Special
[V] Tunes **
Vanity Lair

 (+) – This show is previously shown on STAR World both the Philippines and Middle East only. 
(++) – Current shows will also be shown only STAR Sports and STAR World.
(+++) – Previously shown on STAR World exclusive for the Philippines only.
(++++) – This show is previously shown on STAR Movies.
 (*) – This show is exclusive for Malaysia viewers only. Also Available in STAR World exclusive for the Philippines only. 
 (**) – This show is currently aired over STAR World exclusive for the Philippines and Middle East only.

Previous shows
The following are previous shows of Channel [V] combine programs of the Channel [V]'s Southern Beam (Channel [V] Asia is now separate feed from India which is now Channel [V] International in 1996) including programs from Israel, the UAE and Thailand and the Channel [V]'s Northern Beam (now Channel [V] Mainland China which is now separate to Channel [V] Taiwan Feed in 1994) including programs from Philippines, Korea and Japan. Some common programs in the Channel [V]'s Southern Beam are the same title as the Channel [V]'s Northern Beam but have different VJs as well as program content. For example, the Southern Beam host of Channel [V]’s Big Bang is Allesandra while the Northern Beam counterpart is David Wu.

 3 For 3
 A to Z of Rock (available on the Channel [V]'s Southern Beam only)
 Amped
 Artist Versus Artist (available on the Channel [V]'s Northern Beam only)
 Asian Top 20 Countdown
 Asian Chart
 Big Bang
 Big Gig Japan
 Billboard US Countdown
 By Demand
 CelebriT[V] (available in Channel V Philippines only)
 Club X (other previous names as V Spot, now Club V)
 Ek Ka Tu (available in India only)
 The Factory (available in V Chinese only)
 Fashion Police
 First Day First Show (available in India only)
 Flashback (V India Old Hindi film music videos)
 Frame By Frame
 Gone Taiwan (available in V Chinese only)
 Haysad (available in India only)
 Heart and Soul (available in V Chinese only)
 India Top 10 Countdown (Hindi and Western videos)
 International Flight (available in V Chinese only)
 Jump Start
 Korean Top 10 Countdown (available in V Korea only, simulcast with V Chinese)
 Korean Top 20 Countdown (available in V Korea only, simulcast with V Chinese, now V Korea Countdown)
 Launch Pad
 Lollipop (available in Channel V Taiwan only)
 Music Update Tokyo
 Never Enough
 Over The Edge
 OVO – Our Very Own (Channel V Philippines original Pilipino music videos)
 Oye (India's top 20 Hindi film music videos)
 Radio Jam (available in V Taiwan only)
 Rewind (Channel V Philippines Old English music videos, Features music hits from the 1950s, 1960s, 1970s, 1980s, 1990s, 2000s, and 2010s)
 The Ride
 Saya Mahu (Indonesian/Malaysian version of By Demand)
 Sigaw Manila (available on the Channel [V]'s Northern Beam only)
 Smash Hits
 Speakeasy
 The Source (renamed as Channel [V] News)
 The Ticket
 Top of the Pops (available on Channel V India only)
 Turn on TV
 U Rock  (available on V Chinese only)
 V at the Hardrock
 V Eco
 V Montahay (Indian version of By Demand)
 V People (available in India only)
 V Yallah (also known as the Arabic Top 10 Countdown, available on the Channel [V]'s Southern Beam only)
 V1's
 VCV (available in Channel V Philippines only)
 Very China (available in V Chinese only)
 Very Taiwan (available in V Chinese only)
 The Vibe
 VJ Weekend Show
 Watch U Want (available in Channel V Philippines only)
 Wu Man Show (available in the Channel [V] Northern Beam only)
 Youth Corner (available in V Chinese only)

See also
 Channel [V]
 Channel [V] India
 Channel [V] Australia
 Channel [V] Philippines
 Channel [V] Thailand

Lists of television series by network